In the United Kingdom continental time can refer to the Central European Time zone or to the 24-hour clock, though the latter usage has been declining as use of the 24-hour clock has increased.

References 

Time zones